The western bearded greenbul (Criniger barbatus) is a species of songbird in the bulbul family, Pycnonotidae. It is found in West Africa. Its natural habitats are subtropical or tropical dry forests and subtropical or tropical moist lowland forests.

Taxonomy
The western bearded greenbul was formally described and illustrated in 1821 by the Dutch zoologist Coenraad Jacob Temminck from a specimen collected in Sierra Leone. He coined the binomial name Trichophorus barbatus.

Formerly, some authorities considered the eastern bearded greenbul as conspecific with the western bearded greenbul.

Subspecies
Two subspecies are recognized:
 C. b. barbatus (Temminck, 1821) – Found from Sierra Leone to Benin
 C. b. ansorgeanus Hartert, E, 1907 – Found in southern Nigeria

References

Criniger
Birds of West Africa
Western bearded greenbul
Taxonomy articles created by Polbot